Radnor or New Radnor (also called the Radnor District of Boroughs or Radnor Boroughs, especially after 1832) was a constituency in Wales between 1542 and 1885; it elected one Member of Parliament (MP) to the House of Commons of the Parliaments of England (1542–1707), Great Britain (1707–1800) and the United Kingdom (1801–1885), by the first past the post electoral system.  In the Redistribution of Seats Act 1885, the division was merged into Radnorshire.

Some very notable politicians represented the constituency in the House of Commons, including Robert Harley, later Earl of Oxford and Earl Mortimer, Sir George Cornewall Lewis, and the Marquess of Hartington, later 8th Duke of Devonshire.

History

Composition of the borough before the Reform Act
As elsewhere in Wales, the Laws in Wales Acts 1535 and 1542 provided Radnorshire with two members of parliament: one represented the county, and the other a borough constituency named after the county town but including other "contributory boroughs" who were jointly responsible for providing for the upkeep of the MP and, in return, were granted a say in his election. In both cases, the first return of a member was to the Parliament of 1542.

In Tudor times, seven towns apart from New Radnor itself seem to have been regarded at least occasionally as contributory boroughs: Cefnllys, Knighton, Knucklas, Norton, Painscastle, Presteigne and Rhayader. However, by the late 17th century, the exact rights were disputed, and the position was argued before a House of Commons committee after petitions against the result of elections in 1689 and 1690. The committee disallowed the votes from Presteigne and Painscastle (there seem to have been none from Norton to disallow), and thereafter the borough consisted only of New Radnor, Cefnllys, Knighton, Knucklas and Rhayader.

Franchise and character of the constituency
The right to vote in each of the component boroughs was restricted to the freemen of each town, who did not have to be resident within the borough to vote. The result was that honorary freemen were created solely to swing parliamentary elections, and the inhabitants of the towns which made up the constituency rarely had much say in the choice of MP. This abuse was well established in Radnor by the end of the 17th century (as in other constituencies, both in Wales and England, where honorary freemen could vote), and eventually broke the previously established domination of the Harley family over the constituency; but it was still a matter of grievance to the town in 1779, when the inhabitants complained of it to the House of Commons.

At New Radnor, the town corporation controlled the creation of freemen, but the Steward of the King's Manors had the corresponding power at Knighton, Rhayader and Knucklas. These two sources of power competed with the other main landed interest, that of the Price family, for domination of Radnor elections in the 18th century, but it was the Steward who generally got his way. Henry Lewis was steward from 1746 until his death in 1768 and his brother, Thomas Lewis, was MP from 1715 to 1761 (when he was unseated by the House of Commons because of technical errors in the registration of the freemen that supported him).

The new steward was the Earl of Oxford, but he was unable immediately to take control as the Durham Act of 1763 prevented honorary freeman from voting within a year of their creation; however, it transpired that Henry Lewis's patent as Steward had not been properly renewed on the accession of George III in 1760, so that all his more recent creations of freemen were invalid. This immediately undermined Thomas Lewis's majority, and at the 1768 election), although Thomas's son John was declared elected by the returning officer, the result was overturned on petition, the votes of the faultily-created freemen were disallowed, and his opponent Edward Lewis (no relation) was declared elected instead.

By 1774, Oxford's newly created freemen were qualified to vote, but the returning officer (remaining loyal to Thomas Lewis) attempted to disallow the votes of all non-resident freemen. Once more the defeated Edward Lewis petitioned against the result, and was once more successful, the committee deciding that the non-resident freemen of New Radnor and Cefnllys were not entitled to vote but that those of the other three boroughs were; and even in New Radnor and Cefnllys the rights of the non-residents seem to have been restored at the following election. In 1780, the returning officer made a double return, and the Commons decided again in Edward Lewis's favour. From this point onwards, for at least the next thirty years, the Earl's right (and that of his son) to be considered "patron" of the constituency was unchallenged; when in 1790 he withdrew his support from Edward Lewis and instead backed David Murray, Murray defeated Lewis by a two-to-one margin. However, in the last two decades before Reform Richard Price (already the sitting MP) had expanded his personal and family influence sufficiently to be sure of re-election independent of the Oxford interest.

The nature of the franchise dictated that the electorate of the constituency fluctuated considerably over the years, rising when a new creation of freemen was needed to change the balance of voting power, dwindling when the majority was secure since fewer voters made elections cheaper and the constituency easier to manage. In the 1750s there were around 1,000 qualified voters, and as late as 1790 a total of 922 – mostly non-residents – turned out to vote; but the only contested election between then and 1869 was the general election of 1820, when only 268 voters polled.

Reform and abolition
By 1831, none of the component boroughs was of any considerable size: New Radnor had a population of approximately 2,500, Knighton of 1,076, Rhayader of 669, Knucklas of 236 and Cefnllys of only 28. Under the Great Reform Act the constituency kept its one MP, but Presteigne (which had for centuries been recognised as the county town) was added as a contributory borough, and Rhayader's boundaries were slightly extended. This raised the total population of the constituency to around 6,355, and under the revised franchise there were 529 electors on the register at the 1832 election.

In the entire period between the first and second Reform Acts there was no contested election for the Radnor boroughs. The 1868 reforms doubled the electorate, and from this point onwards the constituency proved a safe seat for the Liberal candidate whenever a contest was held.

The constituency was abolished in the redistribution of seats in 1885, being merged into the Radnorshire county constituency.

Members of Parliament

1542–1640

1640–1885

Notes

Election results

Elections in the 1830s

Elections in the 1840s

Elections in the 1850s

Lewis' death caused a by-election.

Lewis was appointed Chancellor of the Exchequer, requiring a by-election.

Lewis was appointed Home Secretary, requiring a by-election.

Elections in the 1860s
Lewis' death caused a by-election.

Green-Price's resignation caused a by-election.

Elections in the 1870s

Elections in the 1880s

Cavendish was also elected MP for North East Lancashire and opted to sit there, causing a by-election.

Williams resigned, causing a by-election.

References

Sources

W. R. Williams The Parliamentary History of the Principality of Wales
Robert Beatson, A Chronological Register of Both Houses of Parliament (London: Longman, Hurst, Res & Orme, 1807) 
D Brunton & D H Pennington, Members of the Long Parliament (London: George Allen & Unwin, 1954)
Cobbett's Parliamentary history of England, from the Norman Conquest in 1066 to the year 1803 (London: Thomas Hansard, 1808) 
F W S Craig, British Parliamentary Election Results 1832–1885 (2nd edition, Aldershot: Parliamentary Research Services, 1989)
 T. H. B. Oldfield, The Representative History of Great Britain and Ireland (London: Baldwin, Cradock & Joy, 1816)
 Edward Porritt and Annie G Porritt, The Unreformed House of Commons (Cambridge University Press, 1903)
 Robert Walcott, English Politics in the Early Eighteenth Century (Oxford: Oxford University Press, 1956)

Historic parliamentary constituencies in Mid Wales
Constituencies of the Parliament of the United Kingdom established in 1542
Constituencies of the Parliament of the United Kingdom disestablished in 1885